Lois Greenfield (born April 18, 1949) is an American photographer best known for her unique approach to photographing the human form in motion. Born in New York City, she attended Hunter College Elementary School, the Fieldston School, and Brandeis University. Greenfield majored in Anthropology and expected to become an ethnographic filmmaker but instead, she became a photojournalist for local Boston newspapers. She traveled around the world on various assignments as a photojournalist but her career path changed in the mid-1970s when she was assigned to shoot a dress rehearsal for a dance concert. Greenfield has since specialized in photographing dancers in her photo studio as part of her exploration of the expressive potential of movement.

She has created images for the world's most well known dance companies such as Alvin Ailey, Martha Graham, Merce Cunningham, Paul Taylor, Bill T. Jones/Arnie Zane Dance Company, and American Ballet Theatre.  Her work has been published in numerous periodicals, and has been exhibited in museums and galleries around the world. Based in New York City, she gives workshops and lectures in schools around the world.

Beginning of career
In the mid-1970s, Greenfield began what would become a twenty-year relationship with The Village Voice photographing dance companies reviewed by dance critic Deborah Jowitt for her weekly column. This led to assignments from newspapers and magazines around the world. Around this time she had the opportunity to interview and write about many photographers whom she admired. Among her subjects were Jacques Henri Lartigue, André Kertész, Duane Michals, and Barbara Morgan, who along with photographer Max Waldman were her biggest inspirations.

Rehearsal to Studio

By the late 70's, she became dissatisfied with a documentary approach to dance photography, which she considered to be merely capturing someone else's art form. This led Greenfield to discover what would become her own visual syntax.

In 1980, she set up a studio where she invited her subjects to improvise, and together they explored high–risk and non-repeatable moments that could only be seen as a photograph. She created moments expressly for the camera, exploiting photography's ability to slice time into 1/2000 of a second, revealing to the viewer what the naked eye can't see. Greenfield describes her use of the medium format Hasselblad camera and how it influenced her:

Greenfield developed a radical way of photographing movement. Her dancers appear weightless, freed from the constraints of gravity and locked together in seemingly impossible configurations. The more incomprehensible the picture looked, the more successful it was in Greenfield's eyes: "What intrigues me is making images that confound and confuse the viewer, but that the viewer knows, or suspects, really happened [...] I can't depict the moments before or after the camera's click, but I invite the viewer's consideration of that question."

Since these early experiments, her photographic method has stayed pretty much the same - shooting just one moment out of a phrase of movement, and never digitally compositing the dancers' positions in the frame. All her photographs are literal documents, taken as single in-camera images. According to Samantha Clark, "The most interesting moments are the ambiguous ones when you really don't know what is happening or why. The buoyant images in Greenfield's art might have even fooled Galileo, Newton and Einstein."

Commercial
Commercial clients picked up on the metaphoric nature of Greenfield's imagery, and commissioned her to create campaigns. Her photos and videos have been featured in campaigns for Sony, Disney, Rolex, Hanes, Pepsi, Johnson & Johnson, Epson, and Kodak, among others. Her most recognized commercial assignment was the series of advertisements she created for Raymond Weil watches in 1993, which appeared on billboards and ads worldwide. Greenfield has also directed numerous videos and TV commercials.

Collaborations
Since the mid-1990s, Greenfield has been fascinated by non-traditional forms of photographic presentation. Invited to participate in "Le Printemps de Cahors" in France in 1994, she projected her images onto a 30-foot high water screen in the Lot River.

She pioneered the use of live photography as an integral part of a dance performance. Greenfield collaborated from 2003 to 2007 with the Australian Dance Theatre on HELD, a dance inspired by her photography. Greenfield was onstage shooting the live action, and her images were projected on the stage in real-time. The dance and its representation appeared virtually simultaneously as part of the performance. The dance was performed at the Sydney Opera House, Sadler's Wells in London, the Joyce Theater in NYC and Theatre de la Ville, Paris.

Artist-In-Residence
2014 – NYU / Tisch Department of Dance and New Media
2012 – Syracuse University

Selected Exhibits (1983-2019)

Exbibits include:

 The International Center of Photography, NYC
 French Foundation of Photography, France
 Musee de L'Elysee, Lausanne, Switzerland
 The Tel Aviv Art Museum, Israel
 The Erarta Contemporary Museum, St. Petersburg, Russia
 The Venice Biennale, Italy
 Mikimoto Gallery, Tokyo, Japan
 Nordic Light Festival, Norway
 Jacob's Pillow Festival, US
 Pingyao Festival, China
 Melbourne Arts Festival, Australia
 The New Zealand Festival of Arts
 Bienal de Danza de Cali, Colombia
 Urban Art Festival, Shenzen, China

Collections
 The International Center of Photography
 Musee de L'Elysée, Lausanne, Switzerland
 New York Library for the Performing Arts
 Harvard Art Museums, Boston, MA
 Walker Art Center, Minneapolis, MN
 Cooper Hewitt, Smithsonian Design Museum 
 Bard College, Annandale-on-Hudson
 Bibliothèque nationale de France, Paris, France
 The National Museum of Dance, Saratoga Springs, NY
 Solari Foundation Photography Collection, Tempe, AZ     
 The Southeast Museum of Photography, Daytona Beach, FL
 Center for Creative Arts, St. Louis, MO
 Lafayette College, Easton, PA
 The Avon Collection, NYC

Awards and honors
 2018 –  Artist Inspiration Awakening Award – Rubans Rouges Dance
 2016 –  Lifetime Achievement Award – McCallum Theatre Institute
 2015 –  Dance in Focus Award – The Film Society of Lincoln Center and Dance Films Association 
 2005 – Dance Theater Workshop/Live Arts NYC
 AWARDS - Hasselblad, Graphis, Creativity, The One Club

Books
 Breaking Bounds: The Dance Photography of Lois Greenfield, 1992, Text by William A. Ewing (Thames & Hudson Ltd. UK & France; Chronicle Books USA; JICC, Japan). 
 Airborne: The New Dance Photography of Lois Greenfield, 1998, Text by William A. Ewing (Thames & Hudson Ltd. UK; Chronicle Books USA). 
 Lois Greenfield: Moving Still, 2015, Text by William A. Ewing (Thames & Hudson Ltd. UK; Chronicle Books USA).

References

Further reading

External links

ASMP New York Presents Moving Still: A Conversation with Lois Greenfield 2017
Thames & Hudsons's Andrew Sanigar interviews Lois Greenfield at Photo London 2016

American photographers
Brandeis University alumni
1949 births
Living people
American women photographers